Zardeyn (also Romanized as Zardīn; also known as Zardan and Zard Deh) is a village in Zardeyn Rural District of Nir District of Taft County, Yazd province, Iran. At the 2006 National Census, its population was 767 in 236 households. The following census in 2011 counted 590 people in 208 households. The latest census in 2016 showed a population of 556 people in 210 households; it was the largest village in its rural district.

References 

Taft County

Populated places in Yazd Province

Populated places in Taft County